Kara Shiraz Football Club is an Iranian football club based in Shiraz, Fars who play in Iran Football's 2nd Division.

The club also runs U21, U19, a women's futsal team.

History
Kara Shiraz Football Club was established in 2009 by businessmen Ali Bahadori and Samed Ghorbanizadeh. The club started playing in the Fars Provincial League soon after. In spring of 2015 Kara was promoted to the Iran Football's 2nd Division after finishing in first place in Group B of Iran Football's 3rd Division. Kara gained recognition inside Iran in 2015 after they defeated Persian Gulf Pro League side Esteghlal Ahvaz in the Hazfi Cup.

Players

First-team squad
As of 20 September 2015

References

Football clubs in Iran
Sport in Shiraz
2009 establishments in Iran
Association football clubs established in 2009